Penty is a surname. Notable people with the surname include:

Arthur Penty (1875–1937), British architect
Diana Penty, Indian actress
Richard Penty (born 1964), British engineer
Toby Penty (born 1992), British badminton player
Walter Green Penty (1852–1902), British architect
Jonathan Charles Penty (born 1994), British Comedian